The Schalkenmehrener Maar is a maar roughly 3 kilometres southeast of the town of Daun in the Eifel in the German state of Rhineland-Palatinate.

It is one of the Daun Maars (Dauner Maare) or Daun Maar Group and is a double maar, comprising a western maar lake and an eastern dry maar. Both were formed around 10,500 years ago as the result of a phreatomagmatic explosion. The lake in the western part of the maar varies between 500 and 575 metres in diameter and is up to 21 metres deep. The height of the maar above sea level is 420 metres (average elevation of the water surface). It fills the more recent of the 2 maar basins. The eastern part of the maar is occupied by a raised bog.

Botanically, three different zones can be distinguished: the shore area, the raised bog and the slopes of the maar basin. In the shore area, as well as the reeds there are communities of yellow iris, white water-lily, yellow loosestrife, purple loosestrife and club-rush. The slopes of the maar basin are dominated by a mix of dry grassland and woodland edge vegetation. In addition to Breckland thyme and oregano, there is restharrow, hare's-foot clover, hop trefoil, narrow-leaved everlasting pea, musk mallow, clustered bellflower, downy hemp-nettle, fox and cubs, brown knapweed, greater knapweed, small scabious, woodruff and large communities of rosebay willow-herb. Neophytes that may be seen include garden lupins and large-flowered mountain trumpets.

See also 
 List of lakes of Germany

Literature 
 Werner D’hein: Natur- und Kulturführer Vulkanlandeifel. Mit 26 Stationen der "Deutschen Vulkanstraße". Gaasterland-Verlag, Düsseldorf, 2006.

External links 

 Informationen über die Maare

Maars of the Eifel
Vulkaneifel
Nature reserves in Rhineland-Palatinate
Lakes of Rhineland-Palatinate